Teobaldo Depetrini (12 March 1914 – 8 January 1996) was an Italian football player and coach from Vercelli in the Province of Vercelli. He played club football as a midfielder for his hometown side Pro Vercelli, Juventus and Torino.

Depetrini returned to Juventus in a managerial role during part of the 1959 season, however this return was very brief and he was replaced by Renato Cesarini.

Honours
Juventus
Serie A: 1933–34, 1934–35

References

1914 births
1996 deaths
Italian footballers
Juventus F.C. players
F.C. Pro Vercelli 1892 players
Torino F.C. players
Juventus F.C. managers
People from Vercelli
Association football midfielders
Italian football managers
Italy international footballers
Footballers from Piedmont
Sportspeople from the Province of Vercelli